The Ellen Wilkinson School for Girls is a comprehensive, foundation secondary school for 1400 girls aged 11–19 years, located in the London borough of Ealing. The school is named after Ellen Wilkinson, one of the first female MPs in Britain, and the first female Minister for Education. It is situated opposite North Ealing tube station and nearby West Acton tube station.

History

Grammar school
It was known as Ealing County [Grammar] School for Girls.

Comprehensive
It became the Ellen Wilkinson School for Girls in 1974, a comprehensive school, from four schools – St Ann's Secondary Modern, the Wood End and The Grange schools. In April 1992 it became a grant-maintained school. In 1999 it became a foundation school.

Academic
The current Headteacher is Ms R Kruger, who became head teacher in 2014, succeeding Ms C Sydenham.

It was awarded beacon status by the government in recognition of its academic excellence, and as a result became a specialist school for Science and Mathematics. Other particularly strong subjects within the school include English, Psychology, Media Studies, Art, Drama, Geography and Modern Languages. The school has raised standards consistently over the past five years (improving 5A*-C GCSE passes from 58% in 2003 to 76% in 2010,with 6th Form results consistently in the top 15% nationally) and currently appears in The Good Schools Guide, where it is described as 'Ealing's top performing non-selective school'. As a high-performing Specialist School, the school was recently awarded Training School status.

GCSE results consistently outstrip national averages, and in 2010 A Level results showed the fourth highest average points score (735) of Ealing schools, the second highest of the non-selective schools in the borough.

In 2012 the school was rated by the Department for Education as one of the 'top 100 schools in the country', when measured by how much value is added from Key Stage 2 to Key Stage 4

Pastoral Structure
The student body is organised into five 'Divisions': Ranelagh, Madeley, Clare, Queens and the 6th Form. There are numerous inter-division sports competitions conducted throughout the year, as well as matches against other schools. Further extra-curricular activities include musical productions, concerts, regular trips to museums, galleries and theatres, as well as the popular annual school cruise.

The school prides itself on its multicultural, comprehensive intake, and was the first school in the country to receive the SSAT Gold Award for Cultural Diversity

The arts
The school's Performing Arts Department stages a large-scale theatre production each year, featuring girls from all years of the school. Traditionally these have taken place in the school hall, but in 2007 an extra night was added at The Waterman's Theatre in Brentford, an arrangement that will continue this year.

Since 2000 the following shows have been produced at the school:

2000: The Boyfriend
2001: Bugsy Malone
2002: The Wiz
2003: That Ealing Feeling
2004: The Little Shop Of Horrors
2005: Guys and Dolls
2006: Honk
2007: Day & Night
2008: A Midsummer Night's Dream
2009: Moon on a stick
2010: 10 years 1 show (which features all the shows ever performed at Ellen Wilkinson)
2011: Hairspray
2012: Les Misérables
2013: Coram Boy
2014: Day & Night (revived)
2015: Into the Woods
2016: The Little Shop Of Horrors
2017: Oliver
2018: Annie
2019: Beauty and the Beast

Notable former pupils
 Tina Daheley - journalist, newsreader and presenter

Ealing Grammar School for Girls

 Shirley Becke OBE - police officer
 Honor Blackman - actress
 Tina Daheley - BBC reporter
 Leonie Elliott - actor
 Dame Wendy Hall CBE - Professor of Computer Science since 1994 at the University of Southampton
 Maxine Nightingale - singer
 Gloria Obianyo - actor, nominated in the Ian Charleson Awards 2022
 Gillian Rose - philosopher
 Jacqueline Rose - Professor of English since 1992 at Queen Mary, University of London
 Sylvia Tait - biochemist and endocrinologist
Julie Carter 1970-1977
Ealing MP

External links
 The Ellen Wilkinson School website
 The Ellen Wilkinson School Flickr Site
 Old school website
 EduBase

Girls' schools in London
Secondary schools in the London Borough of Ealing
Educational institutions established in 1974
1974 establishments in England
Foundation schools in the London Borough of Ealing
Training schools in England
Acton, London